Rex Kenneth Stevenson  (born 16 October 1942) is an Australian company director and former intelligence officer, who was the Director-General of the Australian Secret Intelligence Service from 1992 to 1998.

Born in Melbourne, Stevenson attended Northcote High School, and then studied a Bachelor of Arts with Honours and a Master of Arts at Monash University. His 1970 masters thesis, Cultivators and administrators: British educational policy towards the Malays, 1875–1906, was published as a book by Oxford University Press in 1975.

Stevenson began his career as an intelligence officer in 1973, and by 1990 he was the Deputy Director-General of the Australian Secret Intelligence Service (ASIS). On 25 November 1992, he was promoted to acting Director-General and was officially appointed to the role two weeks later on 9 December.

After his retirement from ASIS in 1998, Stevenson co-founded the security consulting firms Signet Group and Spectrum Consultancy.

References

1942 births
Living people
Directors-General of the Australian Secret Intelligence Service
Australian spies
Officers of the Order of Australia
Monash University alumni
Public servants from Melbourne